Gol Mim (also Romanized as Gol Mīm and Gol Meym) is a village in Dughayi Rural District, in the Central District of Quchan County, Razavi Khorasan Province, Iran. At the 2006 census, its population was 403, in 121 families.

References 

Populated places in Quchan County